Mylène Dinh-Robic (born April 17, 1979) is a Canadian actress.

Biography
A francophone of Vietnamese and Quebecois heritage, Mylène Dinh-Robic was born and raised in Montreal, Quebec. She has worked on stage, on camera and in video games. She first performed opposite actor Nicholas Campbell as Rita Mah, one of the main characters in the Vancouver produced television series Da Vinci's City Hall (CBC). She later worked in Toronto on 3 seasons of The listener (CTV) as Dr. Olivia Fawcett  and went on to portray officer Beatrice ‘Bear’ Hamelin, for 4 years in Bravo Canada’s critically acclaimed show 19-2. Mylène’s notable work in French includes Montreal shot productions Plan B, Discussion avec mes parents and Double Faute and she presently portrays Vera Rosenbaum in Quebec network TVA’s Les Bracelets Rouges.

Her voice and motion capture work in video games began with the role of Liza Snow in Ubisoft Montreal’s Far Cry 3 and she more recently portrayed Star Lord’s mother, Meredith Quill, in Marvel’s Guardians of the Galaxy.

Mylène resides in Montreal and holds a BA in Communications from Concordia University. She studied acting with Benjamin Ratner and Nancy Sivak in Vancouver and with Gilles Plouffe and John Strasberg in Montreal.

Filmography

Television

 Da Vinci's Inquest – Odette (2003)
 Young Blades – Sister Eleanor (2005)
 The 4400 – Kimmy (2005)
 Da Vinci's City Hall – Rita Mah (2005-2006)
 Smallville – Canadian Daughter (2007)
 Stargate: Atlantis – Anika (2008)
 The Quality of Life – Rita Mah (2008)
 The Border – Detective Sergeant Claudette Mackenzie (2009)
 Toute La Vérité – Catherine-Anne (2010)
 Republic of Doyle – Olive Maher (2012)
 The Listener – Olivia Fawcett (2009-2012)
 Série Noire – Evelyne (2014)
 Les Jeunes Loups – Me Nguyen (2014)
 Being Human – Caroline (2014)
 Nouvelle Adresse – Suki Bernier (2014)
 19-2 – Beatrice 'Bear' Hamelin (2014-2017)
 Yellow (Short) – Ghost Woman (2017)
 The Detectives – Nancy Allen (2018)
 Plan B – Josée (2018)
 The Bold Type – Christina Rose (2019)
 Jérémie – Marina (2019)
 Piégés - Lucie Lacerte (2020)
 Toute la vie - Murielle Casavant (2020)
 Une Autre Histoire - Sgt Tran-Lapointe (2021)
 Transplant - Liz (2020)
 Three Pines - Sandra Morrow (2022)
 Les Bracelets Rouges - Dr. Vera Rosenbaum (2022-2023)

Film 

 Mount Pleasant – Louise (2006)
 L'Oiseau Mort (Short) – Mme Faure (2006)
 Lac Mystère – Kim (French Feature) (2013)
 Medic (Short) – Megan (2016)
 Good Sam – Marie Ellis (2019)
 Chaos Walking – Julie (2021)
 Fatherhood – Denise (2021)
 The Wolf and the Lion – Dean at Music Academy (2021)
 Sam – Directrice (French Feature) (2021)
 Si Seulement...peut-être... (Short) – Midori (2022)

Video games 

 Far Cry 3 – Liza Snow (2012)
 Watch Dogs – Rose Washington (2014)
 Far Cry 4 – Noore (2014)
 Deus Ex: Mankind Divided  – Delara Auzenne (2016)
 Deus Ex: Mankind Divided - A Criminal Past  – Delara Auzenne (2017)
 Outriders – MC Female (2021)
 Marvel's Guardians of the Galaxy – Meredith Quill (2021)

References

External links
 
 

1979 births
Living people
21st-century Canadian actresses
Actresses from Montreal
Canadian film actresses
Canadian television actresses
Canadian video game actresses
Canadian voice actresses
Concordia University alumni
French Quebecers
Canadian actresses of Vietnamese descent